SETI is the fourth studio album by Norwegian metal band The Kovenant, released in 2003 through Nuclear Blast.

Album history
With their second Norwegian Grammy, the band toured Europe and the United States to promote the album. While in the United States the band found a new member, Angel, who would play guitars with Psy Coma; he is not of the black metal scene, but is influenced by bands such as Whitesnake.

Deciding to take a break from recording music the band went their separate ways after they returned to Europe. During 2002 a remastered version of In Times Before the Light and a re-release of Nexus Polaris took place. By November 2002 the band decided to record a fourth album.

In 2003, the new album SETI was released and the band decided to do more touring than last time. However this conflicted with Von Blomberg's other projects (e.g. Mayhem) and it was decided that he would leave the band.

Prior to the release of the actual album, Nuclear Blast issued an EP, SETI Club, consisting of two songs and "club versions" of another two songs from SETI.

Soon two other members were recruited, Küth (of Ram-Zet) on drums and Brat (of Apoptygma Berzerk) on keyboards. With these new members The Kovenant again toured Europe and the United States.

Track listing

Personnel
Lex Icon - vocals, keyboards
Psy-Coma - guitars, keyboards, programming
Von Blomberg - drums

Additional personnel
Siggi Bemm - additional bass, recording, mixing, mastering
Jan Kazda - bass
Eileen Küpper - vocals (soprano)
Erik Ljunggren - programming (additional), sound design
Markus Staiger - executive producer
Joachim Luetke - cover concept, design
Espen Tollefsen - photography
Dennis Koehne - engineering assistant
Dan Diamond - producer, mixing

External links
 SETI at Nuclear Blast
 SETI at Encyclopaedia Metallum

2003 albums
The Kovenant albums
Nuclear Blast albums